Gretchen Craft Rubin (born December 14, 1965) is an American author, blogger and speaker.

Early life and education
Born Gretchen Anne Craft, Gretchen Rubin grew up in Kansas City, Missouri, where her father was a lawyer at the firm of Craft, Fridkin & Rhyne. She attended The Pembroke Hill School. She received her undergraduate and law degrees from Yale University, was editor-in-chief of the Yale Law Journal and won the Edgar M. Cullen Prize.

Career

Law career 
Rubin clerked for Judge Pierre N. Leval of the U.S. Court of Appeals for the Second Circuit, and then on the U.S. Supreme Court for Justice Sandra Day O'Connor from 1995 to 1996. After her clerkships, she served as a chief adviser to Federal Communications Commission Chairman Reed Hundt. She has also been a lecturer at the Yale Law School and the Yale School of Management.

Writing career 
Rubin is a writer on subjects of habits, happiness, and human nature. She is the author of the New York Times bestsellers Better Than Before, Happier at Home, and The Happiness Project. Rubin's books have sold more than two million print and online copies worldwide in over thirty languages. On her daily blog, GretchenRubin.com, she reports on her adventures in pursuit of habits and happiness. On her weekly podcast, Happier with Gretchen Rubin, she discusses good habits and happiness with her sister Elizabeth Craft, a Los Angeles-based television writer. The podcast won the 2016 Academy of Podcasters award for best health and fitness podcast and was a finalist in 2017. On August 10, 2003, Brian Lamb interviewed Rubin on the television show, Booknotes.

She is author of The Happiness Project: Or Why I Spent a Year Trying to Sing in the Morning, Clean My Closets, Fight Right, Read Aristotle, and Generally Have More Fun. On September 4, 2012, Rubin published the follow-up book Happier at Home: Kiss More, Jump More, Abandon a Project, Read Samuel Johnson, and My Other Experiments in the Practice of Everyday Life.  Her third book, Power Money Fame Sex: A User’s Guide, parodied self-help books by analyzing and exposing the techniques used to exploit those who strive for those worldly ambitions.

Her book Better Than Before: What I Learned About Making and Breaking Habits--to Sleep More, Quit Sugar, Procrastinate Less, and Generally Build a Happier Life recommends setting manageable goals, and breaking up tasks into small steps. Her two biographies, Forty Ways to Look at Winston Churchill and Forty Ways to Look at JFK uses the "forty ways" structure to explore the complexities of these two great figures and to demonstrate the limits of biography.

Her book, The Four Tendencies: The Indispensable Personality Profiles That Reveal How to Make Your Life Better (and Other People's Lives Better, Too), was published on September 12, 2017.

In 2017, Rubin helped create the "Joy Index," a list of the ten "most joyous" places to visit, based on several "happiness factors".

In March 2019, she published a new book, Outer Order: Inner Calm, in which she continues to trace the connection between happiness and personal habits.

Personal life
Rubin lives on Manhattan's Upper East Side with her husband, James ("Jamie") Rubin (son of former Clinton-administration Treasury Secretary and Goldman Sachs CEO Robert Rubin), a senior fellow at the Brookings Institution, and children.

Writings

Books
 Forty Ways to Look at Winston Churchill: A Brief Account of a Long Life. New York: Ballantine Books, 2003. 
 Forty Ways to Look at JFK. New York: Ballantine Books, 2005. 
 Power Money Fame Sex: A User's Guide. Atria, 2005. 
 Profane Waste. Gregory R. Miller & Company, 2006. 
  The Happiness Project: Or Why I Spent a Year Trying to Sing in the Morning, Clean My Closets, Fight Right, Read Aristotle, and Generally Have More Fun. New York, NY: Harper, 2009.  
 Happier at Home: Kiss More, Jump More, Abandon a Project, Read Samuel Johnson, and My Other Experiments in the Practice of Everyday Life. New York, NY: Harper, 2012. 
 Better Than Before: What I Learned About Making and Breaking Habits--to Sleep More, Quit Sugar, Procrastinate Less, and Generally Build a Happier Life. New York, NY: Crown, 2015. 
 The Four Tendencies: The Indispensable Personality Profiles That Reveal How to Make Your Life Better (and Other People's Lives Better, Too).  New York, NY: Crown, 2017. 
Outer Order, Inner Calm. New York, NY: Harmony, 2019.

Articles

See also 
List of law clerks of the Supreme Court of the United States (Seat 8)

References

External links

 
 
 

1966 births
Living people
Writers from Kansas City, Missouri
Writers from New York City
Lawyers from New York City
Law clerks of the Supreme Court of the United States
American self-help writers
Yale Law School alumni
Federal Communications Commission personnel
American women bloggers
American bloggers
American women podcasters
American podcasters
21st-century American women writers
Yale University alumni
American motivational speakers
Women motivational speakers
American women non-fiction writers
21st-century American non-fiction writers